National Route 353 is a national highway of Japan connecting Kiryū, Gunma and Kashiwazaki, Niigata in Japan, with a total length of 187.4 km (116.44 mi). There is a section that is unfinished between Niigata and Gunma, therefore one cannot travel the whole length without significant detours.

Route description
Two sections of National Route 353 in the city of Maebashi and in the town of Nakanojo in Gunma Prefecture are musical roads.

References

National highways in Japan
Roads in Gunma Prefecture
Roads in Niigata Prefecture
Musical roads in Japan